Finland was represented by Marion Rung, with the song "Tom Tom Tom", at the 1973 Eurovision Song Contest, which took place on 7 April in Luxembourg.

Before Eurovision

National final
The Finnish national final was held on February 3 at Finlandia Hall in Helsinki. The show was hosted by Apeli Halinen. The winner was chosen by a professional jury consisting of ten members. Each juror awarded 1 to 10 points for each song. The best and worst points received by each song were ignored in the voting.

Scoreboard

Highest and lowest score received by each song were ignored and they are strikethrough.

The winning song "Tom Tom Tom" was performed in Finnish in the national selection but translated into English for the international Song Contest. The English lyrics were written by Bob Barratt. However, the song title didn't change.

At Eurovision
On the night of the final Marion Rung performed first in the running order, preceding Belgium. The entry was conducted by Ossi Runne. At the close of voting, Finland picked up 93 points and placed 6th of the 17 entries. It was Finland's best placing in the contest by then and would remain so for the next 33 years, until Lordi won the contest for Finland in 2006.

Voting

Sources
Viisukuppila- Muistathan: Suomen karsinnat 1973 
Finnish national final 1973 on natfinals

External links
Full national final on Yle Elävä Arkisto 

1973
Countries in the Eurovision Song Contest 1973
Eurovision